Route 8 on Hong Kong Island is an express bus service operated by New World First Bus (NWFB), between Exhibition Centre station and Heng Fa Chuen.

History
Route 8 was started by China Motor Bus on 12 November 1949, between Wan Chai Ferry (then next to Stuart Road and Shau Kei Wan via King's Road and Shau Kei Wan Road, in response to the inauguration of a new ferry route between Wan Chai and Jordan Road Ferry Pier by HYF, and also with the intention of augment the then congesting Route 2. The route became the first route CMB started after the Second World War.

On 1 August 1954 CMB started a new route with no number between Shau Kei Wan and Chai Wan to serve the new bungalow development area there. At first the new route only serviced during mornings and from noon to evening, but in December service expanded to whole day long. On 1 June 1955 it merged with the main Route 8, with the terminus designated at the intersection between today's Chai Wan Road and Tai Tam Road (at that time, both roads were called Island Road). Still, the terminus was far away from development in Chai Wan, so a new route 8A was started in 1959 as a solution. 8A merged with 8 on 8 February 1961 after completion of widening works on Chai Wan Road. Consequently, the terminus was moved to the resite estates.

On 1 July 1972 the route was classified as an urban slope route, with a price higher than flat-road routes. On the same day service was further extended to San Ha Street, Chai Wan, to service the new Chai Wan Estate. At that time patronage on the route was high and it was usual to have a full bus. Starting from mid-1975, the route was completely serviced by double-deckers. On 22 June 1985 the eastern terminus was moved again to Chai Wan (East) Bus Terminus at Sheung On Street, and again on 1 February 1990 to Siu Sai Wan to serve the new Siu Sai Wan Estate. Partial air-conditioned service started on 27 February 1995, amongst the first batch of CMB routes to have done so.

Route 8 was handed over to NWFB on 1 September 1998 following the end of CMB franchise on Hong Kong Island bus services. Later the Siu Sai Wan terminus was changed to Island Resort.

Patronage on the route started to suffer from slow speed after the establishment of express routes 8X in 1996 and later 8P in 1998. Due to the strong request from local residents, the route was designated an express route on 11 February 2006 with the terminus at Heng Fa Chuen instead of Siu Sai Wan, and the route was changed to Island Eastern Corridor instead of King's Road.

In 2015, route have been extended to Wan Chai North due to the demolition of the Wan Chai Ferry Pier bus terminus for the construction of Sha Tin to Central Link expansion project of Exhibition Centre station until 2022.

Route

Current Route
The route length for both directions is 13.1 km in a time of 44 minutes.

Heng Fa Chuen towards Exhibition Centre station
Shing Tai Road
Roundabout
Shing Tai Road
Wing Tai Road
Chai Wan Road
IEC slip road
Ning Fu Street
Cheung Lee Street
Hong Man Street
Chai Wan Road
Island Eastern Corridor
Hing Fat Street
Wing Hing Street
King's Road
Causeway Road
Irving Street
Pennington Street
Yee Wo Street
Hennessy Road
Fleming Road

Exhibition Centre station towards Heng Fa Chuen
Convention Avenue
Fleming Road
Hennessy Road
Yee Wo Street
Causeway Road
Hing Fat Street
Island Eastern Corridor
Chai Wan Road
Hong Man Street
Cheung Lee Street
Kat Sing Street
Chai Wan Road
Wing Tai Road
Chui Wan Road
Shun Tai Road
Shing Tai Road

Route prior to express designation
Route 8 was a local service before 11 February 2006, which had a distance of 12.5 km for both directions in 66 minutes time, via:

Wan Chai Ferry towards Siu Sai Wan
Siu Sai Wan Road
Chai Wan Road
IEC slip road
Ning Fu Street
Cheung Lee Street
Hong Man Street
Chai Wan Road
Shau Kei Wan Road
King's Road
Kornhill Road
King's Road
Causeway Road
Irving Street
Pennington Street
Yee Wo Street
Hennessy Road
Fleming Road
Wan Chai Ferry Bus Terminus access road

Siu Sai Wan towards Wan Chai Ferry
Wan Chai Ferry Bus Terminus access road
Fleming Road
Hennessy Road
Yee Wo Street
Causeway Road
King's Road
Kornhill Road
King's Road
Shau Kei Wan Road
Chai Wan Road
Hong Man Street
Cheung Lee Street
Kat Sing Street
Chai Wan Road
Siu Sai Wan Road

Associated night services
N8, between Exhibition Centre station and Heng Fa Chuen
N8X, between Kennedy Town and Siu Sai Wan (Island Resort)

References

Bus routes in Hong Kong